Charles Ronald George Nall-Cain, 3rd Baron Brocket (born 12 February 1952), also known as Charlie Brocket, is a peer, business owner and television presenter from the United Kingdom. He was jailed for insurance fraud in 1996.

Biography
Brocket is the son of Ronald Nall-Cain and Elizabeth Trotter. His father died when he was nine years old. Aged fifteen, he became the 3rd Baron Brocket on the death of his grandfather, Arthur Nall-Cain, 2nd Baron Brocket, also inheriting Brocket Hall in Hertfordshire. The Hall was in a poor state of repair, and he has since converted it into a hotel and conference venue. He still owns the hall through a trust which leases it to a German consortium. The lease will expire after fifty years.

An Old Etonian, Lord Brocket served in the 14th/20th King's Hussars as a Lieutenant in Germany. He became known as a playboy and, in the 1980s and early 1990s, for his collection of classic cars, once owning forty-two Ferraris. He was convicted of insurance fraud in 1996 and sentenced to five years in prison, of which he served two and a half years. 

In 2004, he was a contestant on the third series of I'm a Celebrity... Get Me Out of Here!. Finishing in fourth place, his new-found fame turned him into a popular TV celebrity, yielding almost £1 million in offers. His autobiography, Call Me Charlie, was published in hardback in September 2004, coming in the Top 10 Best Sellers list of that year. 

Brocket hosted the ITV game show Scream! If You Want to Get Off, and presented Privates Exposed, a behind-the-scenes programme for Lads Army, on ITV2.

In 2007, he launched his own Brocket Hall Foods range of groceries.

In 2017, Brocket was featured in an episode of Can't Pay? We'll Take It Away! (Season 5, Episode 15).

Marriage and family history
In 1982, he married former Vogue model Isabell Maria Lorenzo. They had three children. He and Isabell Maria Lorenzo were divorced in 1994.

 Alexander Christopher Charles Nall-Cain (b. 30 Sep 1984)
 Antalya Stephanie Lauren Nall-Cain b. 1987, married Alexander Frederick, Prince of Prussia (b. 1984), son of Prince Andreas and grandson of Prince Frederick of Prussia (1911–1966).
 William Thomas Anthony Nall-Cain (b. 1991)

In 2006 he married Harriet Victoria Warren. They had two children. 
 Amelia Florence Elizabeth Nall-Cain (b. 8 Sep 2009)
 Iona Jasmine Diana Nall-Cain (b. 20 Oct 2011)

References

External links

H Talent Management Lord Charles Brocket Client Biography

Brocket, Charles Nall-Cain, 3rd Baron
Brocket, Charles Nall-Cain, 3rd Baron
3
Brocket, Charles Nall-Cain, 3rd Baron
People educated at Eton College
Brocket, Charles Nall-Cain, 3rd Baron
British people convicted of fraud
Prisoners and detainees of the United Kingdom
I'm a Celebrity...Get Me Out of Here! (British TV series) participants
Brocket